Asadullah Boroujerdi was a prominent 19th century Muslim Shia clergy member born in the city of Boroujerd.

Children 
His eldest child was Mirza Dawood. His other three children were Mirza Ziaeddin, Mirza Askari and Mirza Mohammad Mehdi. All were among the prominent clerics of their time. Boroujerdi married the daughter of scholar Mirza Qomi and had three children with her, Jamaluddin Muhammad, Fakhr al-Din Muhammad and Nureddin Muhammad, all of whom received their highest clergy ranks from Boroujerdi.

Students 
During his time, Boroujerd became a center for religious studies, and many students attended his lectures. The following are the names of his most famous disciples:
 Sheikh Abdul Rahim Boroujerdi
 Sheikh Muhammad Rahimi Boroujerdi
 Syed Zia-ud-Din Boroujerdi
 Morteza Ansari
 Mullah Ahmad Khansari
 Mulla Muhammad Taqi Gulpaigani
 Agha Bozorg Tehrani
 Muhammad Hasan Ashtiyani

References 

Iranian Shia scholars of Islam
Iranian Shia clerics